Camponotus aurocinctus is a species of ant in the genus Camponotus. The ant was described by Smith in 1858.

Taxonomy
Camponotus aurocinctus was first identified by Frederick Smith in 1858, in his Catalogue of hymenopterous insects in the collection of the British Museum part VI. The species currently has one synonym published – Camponotus midas, described by Walter Wilson Froggatt in 1896.

Distribution

The species is endemic to Australia, and prefers to nest in ground soil, but colonies have strong preferences for nesting in sandy like soils and is usually more encountered foraging during late day times. Workers observed while foraging are found on low vegetation or on the ground, and have been found  Stockyard Plain and Danggali Conservation Park in South Australia.

References

External links

aurocinctus
Hymenoptera of Australia
Insects described in 1858